François Tack (c. 1650 – 8 February 1686) was a Dutch East India Company (VOC) officer. Ranked captain at the time of his death, he was one of the VOC's main commanders during the 1678 Kediri campaign  against Trunajaya and participated in the city's assault. He was later killed during a brawl at the court of Mataram in Kartasura on 8 February 1686, where he was sent on a diplomatic mission.

See also
 Anthonio Hurdt, the overall VOC commander of the Kediri campaign.
 Isaac de Saint-Martin

References

Bibliography
 
 
 

Dutch East India Company people
1686 deaths
Year of birth uncertain